The 2010 Duke University faux sex thesis controversy arose from a private 42-page PowerPoint document written by a Duke University senior, Karen Owen, in the format of a thesis about her sexual experiences during her time attending the university.

The controversy
Shortly before graduating from Duke University in May 2010, Karen Owen wrote a thesis styled document about her sexual experiences during her time attending the university. She privately distributed the document to three friends. In mid-September 2010, during Homecoming weekend, one of these friends decided to forward it onward, and the document went viral. In the faux thesis, titled "An education beyond the classroom: excelling in the realm of horizontal academics", Owen ranked her partners based on her criteria for performance.

The bulk of the controversy surrounded whether she invaded her partners' rights to privacy, and whether the subjects of Owen's faux thesis have a right to sue, as was done in the case of Jessica Cutler when Cutler published details of her sex life on a blog. It also raised questions as to whether double standards exist if the reaction would have been the same had the faux thesis been written by a male. The faux dissertation attracted additional attention because some of the men whom Owen ranked were from the lacrosse team, and there was an unrelated sex controversy surrounding the team a few years prior.

Reaction
About a month after the faux thesis made headlines, the Duke University History Department held a forum about the long term implications of the faux thesis. A few months after that, The Atlantic published an article discussing this incident in the context of Duke's culture as well as binge drinking by women.

The author

Background
Karen Owen, the author of the faux thesis, grew up in Branford, Connecticut  and graduated from Branford High School in 2006. She won a scholarship to attend Duke and was a very avid sports fan during her time there.

Following the controversy
After her faux dissertation went viral, Owen deleted, closed down, or blocked access to her social networking sites. She stated "that fraternities 'make lists like this all the time.'" She also expressed deep regret over the incident, saying that she would have "never intentionally hurt the people that [were] mentioned [in the faux thesis]."

In popular culture
On December 1, 2010, Law & Order: Special Victims Unit aired an episode called "Rescue", based on the story of Karen Owen's faux sex thesis.
The feature film The Escort features a prostitute with a similar back story, making it impossible for her to get a non-sex work job.

References

External links
A redacted version of Karen Owen's document at Jezebel.com

2010 controversies
2010 in North Carolina
Academic scandals
Casual sex
Faux sex thesis controversy
Internet privacy
Privacy controversies and disputes